The African Content Movement (ACM) is a South African political party founded in December 2018 by former SABC acting Chief operating officer Hlaudi Motsoeneng.

History 
At the party launch, Motsoeneng claimed he would become president, that the country would produce 90% of its requirements, that the economy shall be in the hands of the people, make company workers shareholders, force foreign companies to leave the country and reduce social grants.

The party currently has two seats in Gauteng municipalities after local councillors from the Randfontein People's Party joined the ACM.

It also won two seats in Maluti a Phofung in the 2021 municipal election.

In March 2019, Motsoeneng encouraged former president Jacob Zuma to join the ACM, stating that they shared the same views on transformation.

The party contested the 2019 general election, with Motsoeneng, and actress and former Idols South Africa judge Marah Louw in first and second places respectively on the party's national list, failing to win a seat.

Election results

National Assembly 

|-
! Election
! Total votes
! Share of vote
! Seats
! +/–
! Government
|-
! 2019
| 4,841
| 0.03%
| 
| –
| 
|}

Provincial elections

! rowspan=2 | Election
! colspan=2 | Eastern Cape
! colspan=2 | Free State
! colspan=2 | Gauteng
! colspan=2 | Kwazulu-Natal
! colspan=2 | Limpopo
! colspan=2 | Mpumalanga
! colspan=2 | North-West
! colspan=2 | Northern Cape
! colspan=2 | Western Cape
|-
! % !! Seats
! % !! Seats
! % !! Seats
! % !! Seats
! % !! Seats
! % !! Seats
! % !! Seats
! % !! Seats
! % !! Seats
|-
! 2019
| 0.02% || 0/63
| 0.21% || 0/30
| 0.03% || 0/73
| 0.04% || 0/80
| 0.02% || 0/49
| 0.03% || 0/30
| 0.04% || 0/33
| 0.03% || 0/30
| 0.01% || 0/42
|}

References 

2018 establishments in South Africa
African National Congress breakaway groups
African socialist political parties
Political parties in South Africa
Political parties established in 2018
Socialist parties in South Africa